Gavrilo Princip (25 July 189428 April 1918) was a Bosnian Serb student who assassinated Archduke Franz Ferdinand of Austria and his wife Sophie, Duchess of Hohenberg, in Sarajevo on 28 June 1914.

Princip was born in western Bosnia to a poor Serb family. At the age of 13, he was sent to Sarajevo, the capital of Austrian-occupied Bosnia, to study at the Merchants’ School before transferring to the gymnasium where he became politically aware. In 1911, he joined Young Bosnia, a secret local society aiming to free Bosnia from Austrian rule and achieve the unification of the South Slavs. After attending anti-Austrian demonstrations in Sarajevo, he was expelled from school and walked to Belgrade, Serbia to continue his education. During the First Balkan War, Princip traveled to Southern Serbia to volunteer with the Serbian army's irregular forces fighting against the Ottoman Empire but was rejected for being too small and weak.

In 1913, following the unexpected success of the Serbians in the war against the Ottomans, the Austrian military governor of Bosnia, Oskar Potiorek, declared a state of emergency, dissolved the parliament, imposed martial rule and banned all Serbian public, cultural, and educational societies. Inspired by a spate of assassination attempts against Imperial officials by Slavic nationalists and anarchists, Princip convinced two other young Bosnians to join a plot to assassinate the heir to the Habsburg Empire during his announced visit to Sarajevo. The Black Hand, a Serbian secret society with ties to Serbian military intelligence, provided the conspirators with weapons and training before facilitating their re-entry into Bosnia.

On Sunday 28 June 1914 during the royal couple's visit to Sarajevo, the then teenager Princip mortally wounded both Franz Ferdinand and his wife Sophie by firing a pistol into their convertible car that had unexpectedly stopped  from him. Princip was arrested immediately and tried alongside twenty-four others, all Bosnians and thus Austro-Hungarian subjects. At his trial, Princip stated: "I am a Yugoslav nationalist, aiming for the unification of all Yugoslavs, and I do not care what form of state, but it must be free from Austria." Princip was spared the death penalty because of his age (19) and sentenced to twenty years in prison. He was imprisoned at the Terezín fortress. The Serbian government itself did not inspire the assassination but the Austrian Foreign Office and Army used the murders as a reason for a preventive war which led directly to World War I.

Princip died on 28 April 1918 from tuberculosis exacerbated by poor prison conditions which had already caused the loss of his right arm.

Early life 
He was the second of his parents' nine children, six of whom died in infancy. Princip's mother Marija wanted to name him after her late brother, Špiro, but he was named Gavrilo at the insistence of a local Eastern Orthodox priest, who claimed that naming the sickly infant after the Archangel Gabriel would help him survive.

A Serb family, the Princips had lived in northwestern Bosnia for many centuries. His ancestors came from Grahovo, Nikšić in Montenegro, emigrating in the early 1700s, they were members of the Jovičević clan and adhered to the Serbian Orthodox Christian faith. Princip's parents, Petar and Marija (née Mićić), were poor farmers who lived off the little land that they owned. They belonged to a class of Christian peasants known as kmetovi (serfs), who were often oppressed by their Muslim landlords. Petar, who insisted on "strict correctness", never drank or swore and was ridiculed by his neighbours as a result. In his youth, he fought in the Herzegovina Uprising against the Ottoman Empire. In order to supplement his income and feed his family, he resorted to transporting mail and passengers across the mountains between northwestern Bosnia and Dalmatia.

Despite his father's initial opposition, as he needed a shepherd to guard his sheep, Princip began attending primary school in 1903, aged nine. He overcame a difficult first year and became very successful in his studies, for which he was awarded a collection of Serbian epic poetry by his headmaster. At the age of 13, Princip moved to Sarajevo, where his elder brother Jovan intended to enroll him at Sarajevo's Austro-Hungarian Military Academy. However, by the time Princip reached Sarajevo, Jovan had changed his mind after a shopkeeper advised him not to make his younger brother "an executioner of his own people". Princip was enrolled into the Merchants’ School instead. Jovan paid for his tuition with the money he earned performing manual labour, carrying logs from the forests surrounding Sarajevo to mills within the city. After three years of study, Gavrilo transferred to the Sarajevo Gymnasium.

Joining Young Bosnia
Following the annexation of the region by the Austro-Hungarian empire in 1908, Bosnia, like the other southern Slavic states under imperial rule, yearned for independence. As a result, various student groups emerged interested in movements such as romantic nationalism, nihilism or anti imperialism, while at school and through his roommate Danilo Ilić, Princip was also exposed to socialist, anarchist and communist writing. Princip started to associate with like-minded young nationalist revolutionaries and came to admire Bogdan Žerajić, a Bosnian Serb who had attempted to assassinate the Austro-Hungarian Governor of Bosnia and Herzegovina, before taking his own life. Žerajić, who was from Herzegovina like Princip, came to epitomize, in the eyes of many, the ideal of self sacrifice. On the anniversary of his death, Serb youths from Sarajevo started to visit his grave to lay flowers. According to Luigi Albertini, this is where, after spending nights reflecting at the grave, that Princip resolved to participate in his own attack. In 1911, Princip graduated from the fourth grade and joined Young Bosnia, a society with members from all three major Bosnian ethnic groups, that sought the liberation of Bosnia from Austro-Hungarian rule and the unification of all Southern Slavs in a common nation. Some believed that the newly independent Kingdom of Serbia, as the free part of the south Slavs, was obligated to help unify the southern Slavic peoples. Because the local authorities had forbidden students to form organisations and clubs, Princip and other members of Young Bosnia met in secret. During their meetings, they discussed literature, ethics and politics.

On 18 February 1912, Princip took part in a demonstration against the Habsburg authority in Sarajevo, organised by Luka Jukić, a Croat student from Bosnia. The demonstrators burned a Hungarian flag and many were injured and arrested by the police. During the scuffle Princip was hit with a sabre and his clothes were torn. The following day the students declared a general strike, and for the first time in Bosnian history, Croats, Serbs and Muslims took part together. A student present that day claimed that "Princip went from class to class, threatening with his knuckle-duster all the boys who wavered in coming to the new demonstrations." As a result of his conduct and his involvement in the demonstrations against Austro-Hungarian authorities, Princip was expelled from school  and in the spring of 1912 decided to go to Belgrade, making the 280-kilometre (170 mi) journey on foot. According to one account, he fell to his knees and kissed the ground upon crossing the border into Serbia. Having left Sarajevo without telling his brother, Princip lived without money and in difficult conditions alongside other Bosnian students. In June 1912, he went to the First Belgrade Gymnasium to take the fifth grade exam which he failed.

Upon being rejected because of his small build, he traveled to a different recruitment office this time in Prokuplje, north of the Turkish frontier in southern Serbia. After taking one look at him, Major Vojislav Tankosić, the commander of all Komite units, rejected him for being too small and looking too weak. Humiliated, Princip returned first briefly to Belgrade then back to the village of Hadžići. According to Vladimir Dedijer, his failure to be accepted in the army on the account that he looked weak, was one of the primary motives which pushed Princip to do something exceptionally brave. In the South Slav lands, the unexpected success of the Serbian army resulted in numerous celebrations and demonstrations of support. In reaction on 2 May 1913, while Princip was in Sarajevo, the Austro-Hungarian Governor of Bosnia and Herzegovina General Potiorek declared a state of emergency, suspended the 1910 constitution of Bosnia and Herzegovina, implemented martial law, seized control of all schools, and prohibited all Serb public, cultural and educational societies.

In the summer of 1913 Princip passed the fifth and sixth grades of high school, then in early 1914 he left Sarajevo for Belgrade, stopping briefly in his village to see his parents. While in Belgrade preparing for his sixth-class examinations in the First Belgrade High School, Princip was shown by his friend Nedeljko Čabrinović a newspaper cutting announcing Archduke Franz Ferdinand of Austria's visit to Bosnia in June. Princip decided to lead a group of assassins back to Bosnia and attack the Archduke during his official visit to Sarajevo. He convinced Čabrinović and his old schoolfriend Trifko Grabež to join the plot. They also talked about killing Oskar Potiorek, the provincial governor, as a means of protest against the emergency régime. To find weapons, Princip asked his Bosnian Muslim friend, Djulaga Bukovac, a veteran of the Balkan wars. Bukovac introduced them to Milan Ciganović, another Bosnian expatriate who had fought under Major Tankošić during the Second Balkan War. Ciganović was also a freemason and an associate of the Black Hand, the secretive, ultra-nationalist Serbian group responsible for the regicide of 1903. Ciganović then approached Tankosić, another Black Hand member of Bosnian descent, from whom he obtained the weapons. On 27 May 1914, Ciganović supplied the three young Bosnians with five Browning pistols, six grenades and several vials of poison. Ciganović took the would-be assassins to Topčider forest, just outside the centre of Belgrade, training them on how to use the weapons. Princip proved to be the best marksman. The three-man assassination team left Belgrade on 28 May 1914, taking a river boat that took them to Šabac, they then split up crossing separately the border into Bosnia. Each of them was carrying two bombs tied around their waist as well as revolvers, ammunition and a bottle of cyanide in their pockets. Before leaving Serbia, Princip wrote to his former roommate in Sarajevo Danilo Ilić, to notify him of his assassination plan and to ask him to recruit more people. Ilić recruited Muhamed Mehmedbašić, a Bosnian Muslim carpenter, Cvetko Popović and Vaso Čubrilović, both Bosnian Serb students aged eighteen and seventeen.

Assassination of Archduke Franz Ferdinand 

Archduke Franz Ferdinand of Austria and his wife, Duchess Sophie Chotek arrived in Sarajevo by train shortly before 10 a.m. on 28 June 1914. Their car was the third car of a six-car motorcade heading towards Sarajevo Town Hall. The car's top was rolled back in order to allow the crowds a good view of its occupants.

Princip and the five other conspirators lined the route. They were spaced out along the Appel Quay, each one with instructions to assassinate the Archduke when the royal car reached their position. The first conspirator on the route to see the royal car was Muhamed Mehmedbašić. Standing by the Austro-Hungarian Bank, Mehmedbašić lost his nerve and allowed the car to pass without taking action. At 10:15 am, when the motorcade passed the central police station, nineteen-year-old student Nedeljko Čabrinović hurled a hand grenade at the Archduke's car. The driver accelerated when he saw the object flying towards him, and the bomb, which had a 10-second delay, exploded under the fourth car. Two of the occupants were seriously wounded. After Čabrinović's failed attempt, the motorcade sped away and Princip and the remaining conspirators failed to act due to the motorcade's high speed.

After the Archduke gave his scheduled speech at Town Hall, he decided to visit the victims of Čabrinović's grenade attack at the Sarajevo Hospital. In order to avoid the city centre, General Oskar Potiorek decided that the royal car should travel straight along the Appel Quay to the hospital. However, Potiorek forgot to inform the driver, a Czech named Leopold Lojka, about this decision. On the way to the hospital, Lojka, following the original plan, turned onto a side street where Princip had positioned himself in front of a local delicatessen. After the Governor shouted at him, Lojka stopped in front of a shop and began to reverse. As he did so the engine stalled and the gears locked. Princip stepped forward, drew a Browning Semi-automatic pistol, and at point-blank range fired twice into the car, first hitting the Archduke in the neck, and then hitting the Duchess in the abdomen. They both died shortly after.

Arrest and trial 

Before Princip could fire for a third time, the pistol was wrestled from his hand and he was pushed to the ground. He managed to swallow a capsule of cyanide, which failed to kill him. The trial opened on 12 October and lasted until 23 October 1914. Princip and twenty-four people were indicted. All six assassins, except Mehmedbašić, were under twenty at the time of the assassination, while the group was dominated by Bosnian Serbs, four of the indicted were Bosnian Croats and all of them were Austro-Hungarian citizens, none being from Serbia. The state's attorney charged twenty-two of the accused with high treason and murder and three with complicity in the murder. Princip stated that he regretted the killing of the Duchess and meant to kill Potiorek, but was nonetheless proud of what he had done. The Austrian police investigators were eager to emphasise the exclusively Serbian nature of the assassination plot for political reasons, but during his trial Princip insisted that, even though he was an ethnic Serb, his commitment was to freeing all south Slavs. All the chief conspirators mentioned the revolutionary destruction of Austria-Hungary and the liberation of the South Slavs as the motivation behind their act.

The Austro-Hungarian authorities tried to hide the fact that the conspirators included Croats and Bosniaks, going as far as changing the name of one of them in the press reports, in order to portray the entire scheme as being of Serbian origin and carried out only by Serbs. Since it provided the weapons to the assassins and helped them cross the border, the Black Hand was implicated in the assassination. This did not prove that the Serbian government knew about the assassination, let alone approved of it, but was enough for Austria-Hungary to issue a démarche to Serbia known as the July Ultimatum, which led up to the outbreak of World War I. According to David Fromkin what the killings gave Vienna was not a reason, but an excuse, for destroying Serbia.

Princip was nineteen years old at the time and too young to be executed, as he was twenty-seven days shy of the twenty-year minimum age limit required by Habsburg law. On Thursday 28 October 1914 the court found Princip guilty of murder and high treason, he received the maximum sentence of twenty years in prison, he was to serve out his sentence in a military prison within the Habsburg fortress of Theresienstadt in northern Bohemia (now in the Czech Republic).

Imprisonment and death 

Princip was chained to a wall in solitary confinement at the Small Fortress in Terezín, where he lived in harsh conditions and suffered from tuberculosis. The disease ate away his bones so badly that his right arm had to be amputated. In January 1916, Princip unsuccessfully attempted to hang himself with a towel. From February to June 1916, Princip met with Martin Pappenheim, a psychiatrist in the Austro-Hungarian army, four times. Pappenheim wrote that Princip asserted that the First World War would have occurred even if the assassination had not taken place, and that he "cannot feel himself responsible for the catastrophe".

Gavrilo Princip died on 28 April 1918, three years and ten months after the assassination.

Fearing his bones might become relics for Slavic nationalists, Princip's prison guards secretly took the body to an unmarked grave, but a Czech soldier assigned to the burial remembered the location, and in 1920 Princip and the other "Heroes of Vidovdan" were exhumed and brought to Sarajevo, where they were buried together beneath the Vidovdan Heroes Chapel "built to commemorate for eternity our Serb heroes" at the Holy Archangels Cemetery which includes a citation from the Montenegrin poet Njegoš: "Blessed is he who lives forever. He had something to be born for."

Legacy 
Long after his death, Princip's legacy is still disputed and he remains a historically significant but polarising figure. For the Habsburg monarchy and its supporters, he was a murderous terrorist; Royal Yugoslavia portrayed him as a Yugoslav hero; during World War II, Nazis and Croatian fascist Ustasha viewed him as a degenerate criminal and a left-wing anarchist; and for socialist Yugoslavia, he represented a youthful hero of armed resistance, a freedom fighter who fought to liberate all the peoples of Yugoslavia from Imperial rule, fighting for the workers and the oppressed. In the 90s, Princip started to be seen by some as a Serbian nationalist acting for the creation of a Greater Serbia. Political movements and regimes have either praised or demonized him in order to promote their ideology.

Today he is still celebrated as a hero by numerous Serbs and regarded as a terrorist by many Croats and Bosniaks. Asim Sarajlić, a senior MP of the Bosniak nationalist Party of Democratic Action, stated in 2014 that Princip brought an end to "a golden era of history under Austrian rule" and that "we are strongly against the mythology of Princip as a fighter of freedom". Many of Bosnia's Serbs continue to venerate his memory, Nenad Samardžija, the Serb governor of East Sarajevo, said in 2014 that "we once all lived in one state (Yugoslavia), and we never looked on it as any kind of terrorist act" but "a movement of young people who wanted to liberate themselves from colonial slavery".

Memorials and commemoration 

The house where Princip lived in Sarajevo was destroyed during World War I. After the war, it was rebuilt as a museum in the Kingdom of Yugoslavia. Yugoslavia was conquered by Germany in 1941 and Sarajevo became part of the Independent State of Croatia. The Croatian Ustaše destroyed the house again. After the establishment of Communist Yugoslavia in 1944, the house of Gavrilo Princip became a museum again and there was another museum dedicated to him within the city of Sarajevo. During the Yugoslav Wars of the 1990s, the house of Gavrilo Princip was destroyed and then rebuilt for the third time in 2015.

Princip's pistol was confiscated by the authorities and eventually given, along with the Archduke's blood-stained undershirt, to Anton Puntigam, a Jesuit priest who was a close friend of the Archduke and had given the Archduke and his wife their last rites. The pistol and shirt remained in the possession of the Austrian Jesuits until they were offered on long-term loan to the Museum of Military History in Vienna in 2004. It is now part of the permanent exhibition there. During the Yugoslavian era, Latin Bridge, the site of the assassination, was renamed Princip's Bridge in remembrance; it reverted to its old name  in 1992. In Sarajevo about a half-dozen memorials to Gavrilo Princip have been erected on the site and torn down with each change in power.

In 1917, a pillar was constructed at the corner of where the assassination took place. It was destroyed the following year. In 1941, the 1930 plaque commemorating Princip was removed by the local Germans when the German Army invaded. It was presented to Adolf Hitler as a birthday gift and kept in a museum, only to be lost after 1945. After World War II, a new plaque went up which claimed that "Gavrilo Princip threw off the German occupiers". During the Bosnian War, embossed footprints marking where Princip fired the fatal shots were torn out.

As the centenary of the assassination neared, an apolitical plaque was put up at the corner where the assassination took place, which states: "From this place on 28 June 1914, Gavrilo Princip assassinated the heir to the Austro-Hungarian throne Franz Ferdinand and his wife Sofia." On 21 April 2014, a bust of Princip was unveiled in Tovariševo, and on the centenary itself, a statue was erected in East Sarajevo. A year later, a statue of Princip was unveiled in Belgrade by the President of Serbia Tomislav Nikolić and the President of Republika Srpska Milorad Dodik, as a gift from Republika Srpska to Serbia. At the unveiling Nikolić gave a speech, saying in part: "Princip was a hero, a symbol of liberation ideas, tyrant-killer, idea-holder of liberation from slavery, which spanned through Europe".

On 11 November 2018, the 100th anniversary of the end of World War I, Princess Anita of Hohenberg, the eldest great-grandchild of Archduke Franz Ferdinand and Branislav Princip, grandnephew of Gavrilo Princip, shook hands in a symbolic act of reconciliation in Graz, Austria.

Portrayals

Film 
In the German drama film 1914 (1931), Carl Balhaus played Gavrilo Princip. Irfan Mensur played Princip in The Day That Shook the World (1975), based on the assassination. He was portrayed by Eugen Knecht in Sarajevo (2014), a German-Austrian television film based on the assassination, and by Joel Basman in The King's Man (2021), the third film in the Kingsman fiction film series.

Notes

References

Sources

Bibliography

Websites

Further reading

External links 

 Gavrilo Princip's statement during trial
 Prison interview with Gavrilo Princip

1894 births
1918 deaths
Assassination of Archduke Franz Ferdinand of Austria
Bosnia and Herzegovina murderers
Former Serbian Orthodox Christians
People from Bosansko Grahovo
People from the Condominium of Bosnia and Herzegovina
Serbs of Bosnia and Herzegovina
Bosnia and Herzegovina atheists
Bosnia and Herzegovina people who died in prison custody
Bosnia and Herzegovina people of World War I
Causes of World War I
People convicted of murder by Austria
20th-century criminals
20th-century deaths from tuberculosis
Serb nationalist assassins
Amputees
Prisoners who died in Austrian detention
Young Bosnia
Yugoslavism
Austro-Hungarian rebels
Burials at Holy Archangels Cemetery, Sarajevo
Tuberculosis deaths in the Czech Republic
Yugoslav nationalists
People convicted of treason against Austria-Hungary
Male murderers